Thangjam Manorama (1971–2004) was a 32-year-old woman from Manipur, India who was killed by the Indian paramilitary unit, 17th Assam Rifles on 11 July 2004. Her bullet-ridden and badly mutilated dead body was found abandoned three kilometers away from her home where she was arrested the night before. She was shot several times. Investigations revealed that she was tortured and raped before being killed but there was involvement of Assam Rifles.

Disparities in official version 
At the time of the arrest, no incriminating items were found, as per the arrest memo.  Later it was stated that a grenade and other items had been seized from her home.

Assam Rifles claimed that she was shot while trying to escape. However, no blood was found near the body despite six bullet wounds.  No soldier was identified as having tried to run or detain her.

Given these disparities,
a commission of inquiry was set up by the Manipur government in 2004, and submitted its report in Nov 2004.
However, the Guwahati High court also looked into the matter and ruled that since the Assam Rifles had been deployed
under the Armed Forces (Special Powers) Act, 1958, the state government did not have jurisdiction over them,
and the case should be dealt with by the central government.  Thus, the report was never released subject to this judgment.

Protests against the AFSPA

The failure to assign culpability in the alleged rape and murder case led to widespread and extended protests in Manipur and Delhi.

Five days after the killing, around 30 middle-aged women walked naked through Imphal to the Assam Rifles headquarters, shouting: "Indian Army, rape us too... We are all Manorama’s mothers."
Padma Shree author M. K. Binodini Devi returned her award in protest.
Protests have continued in 2004 and over the years.

In early 2012, the Justice Varma committee includes measures for reviewing AFSPA as part of a set of steps to reduce violence against women; these measures are partly been attributed to the protests involving Manorama.

Recently, in December 2014, in a case filed at Supreme Court of India, the apex court told to government to pay a compensation of Rs. 10 lakhs to Manorama's family. The case was accepted for hearing in the court. It was seen as one of the partial victory, but the doubt remains the same as even in past, compensations were declared for victims of AFSPA, but courts could not spell any judgement against culprits for awarding punishment.

References

People from Manipur
1970 births
2004 deaths
Violence against women in India
People murdered in India
Indian murder victims
Indian women in war
Women in 21st-century warfare
20th-century Indian women
20th-century Indian people